Gogamukh College, established in 1981, is a general degree college situated at Gogamukh, in Dhemaji district, Assam. This college is affiliated with the Dibrugarh University.

Departments

Science
Physics
Mathematics
Chemistry
Botany
Zoology
Anthropology
Electronics

Arts 
 Assamese
 Bodo
 English
History
Education
Economics
Philosophy
Political Science
Geography

References

External links
http://gogamukhcollege.net/

Universities and colleges in Assam
Colleges affiliated to Dibrugarh University
Educational institutions established in 1981
1981 establishments in Assam